Kimmo Kananen (born 11 December 1980) is a Finnish former racing cyclist. He finished in third place in the Finnish National Road Race Championships in 2010.

References

External links

1980 births
Living people
Finnish male cyclists
Sportspeople from Lahti